The International MS Journal is a medical journal published by Cambridge Medical Publications carrying reviews on multiple sclerosis. The journal, edited by Douglas Goodin, is also the host of MSForum.net

External links 
 

Neurology journals
Triannual journals
Publications established in 1994
English-language journals